Gil Assayas (also known as GLASYS) is an Israeli composer, keyboardist, producer, and vocalist. Previously, he was the lead vocalist and keyboardist of the band missFlag. He currently resides in Portland, Oregon.

Assayas released the first GLASYS EP, The Pressure, in 2016. In 2018, he released a cover of the Dark World theme from The Legend of Zelda. In 2019, he funded the production of a full-length GLASYS album using Kickstarter, to be delivered mid-year.

Assayas has also released numerous videos through his GLASYS YouTube channel, often focusing on improvisations or new equipment he is trying out.

In 2018, Assayas toured as the keyboardist of Todd Rundgren's band Utopia after the originally-announced keyboardist, Ralph Schuckett, bowed out. He appears in the 2019 live video release from that tour.

In July 2019, Assayas and Rundgren jointly released the single "People".

In 2020, Assayas toured as the keyboardist of Kasim Sulton's band Kasim Sulton's Utopia.

In 2021, Assayas appeared on Storybound (podcast).

References

External links 
 
 

21st-century Israeli male musicians
Living people
Musicians from Portland, Oregon
Year of birth missing (living people)